Fausto Rossi (born 3 December 1990) is an Italian professional footballer who plays as a central midfielder for  club Reggiana.

Club career

Juventus
Born in Turin, Italy, Rossi joined the Juventus F.C. Youth Sector in 1999, at the age of 8. After progressing through the club's youth academy, Rossi joined the Primavera (Under-20) roster in 2008 and also began to earn senior call-ups during the 2008-09 Serie A campaign, under Claudio Ranieri. Rossi also helped the Primavera squad to win two consecutive Viareggio titles in 2009 and 2010.

Vicenza
After graduating the club's youth system, Rossi was sent out to Serie B side, Vicenza Calcio in a co-ownership deal on 22 July 2010 in order to gain regular first team experience. The 50% registration rights for the player were valued at €500,000. In the same negotiation, Juventus signed Niko Bianconi from Vicenza, also on a co-ownership deal also valued at €500,000. (both valued as €492,000 in Juve's financial statements) Rossi went on to make 16 league appearances for the Serie B outfit in his debut season as a professional, and ultimately remained at the club for the 2011–12 Serie B season.

Juventus return, loans
On 30 January 2012, however, Rossi was re-purchased entirely by Juventus for €1.7 million in a -year contract, with Carlo Pinsoglio moving to Vicenza Calcio for €1.5 million in co-ownership as part of the deal. After returning to Juventus, Rossi was immediately loaned out to Brescia Calcio. With the outfit, Rossi scored 3 goals in 12 appearances for the club during the second half of the 2011–12 season. On 1 July 2012 he signed a new 4-year contract. Rossi's loan deal with Brescia was also renewed on 31 July and Rossi remained a key figure in Brescia's 6th-place finish in the 2012–13 Serie B season, which ultimately saw the club lose out to Livorno in the promotion play-off semi-finals.

Rossi returned to Juventus in June 2013, but signed a one-year loan deal with La Liga side Real Valladolid on 29 August. He scored his first goal on 8 March of the following year, netting the winner against FC Barcelona.

On 31 July 2014 Rossi transferred to newly promoted La Liga team Córdoba CF, also in a temporary deal.

On 31 August 2015 Rossi was swapped with Cristian Bunino of F.C. Pro Vercelli 1892, which Bunino returned to Juventus from loan.

Trapani
On 9 January 2017 signed a contract with Trapani Calcio until the end of season.

Reggiana
On 18 July 2019, he signed with a newly promoted Serie C club Reggiana.

International career
In 2006 Rossi earned his first call-up to represent his country for the Italy U-17 team. He went on to make 2 appearances for the side, before making 3 additional appearances for the  Italy U-20 team between 2008 and 2009. Rossi really made his mark, however, with the Italy U-21 national team, where he was first called up to represent Italy at the 2011 Toulon Tournament, making his debut on 1 June 2011 in a 2–0 victory over the Ivory Coast. He has since been a regular for the side, making 24 appearances and scoring 1 goal. Rossi was a part of the roster that finished runner-up in the 2013 UEFA European Under-21 Football Championship in June 2013, where he was a starter alongside Marco Verratti in the centre of Italy's midfield.

Honours
Universitatea Craiova
Cupa României: 2017–18
Supercupa României: Runner-up 2018

References

External links

1990 births
Living people
Footballers from Turin
Association football midfielders
Italian footballers
Juventus F.C. players
L.R. Vicenza players
Brescia Calcio players
F.C. Pro Vercelli 1892 players
Trapani Calcio players
La Liga players
Real Valladolid players
Córdoba CF players
CS Universitatea Craiova players
Serie B players
Serie C players
Liga I players
Italian expatriate footballers
Italian expatriate sportspeople in Spain
Expatriate footballers in Spain
Italian expatriate sportspeople in Romania
Expatriate footballers in Romania
Italy under-21 international footballers
Italy youth international footballers